Temuco Catholic University is a university in Chile. It is a derivative university part of the Chilean Traditional Universities.

Temuco
Catholic universities and colleges in Chile
Educational institutions established in 1991
1991 establishments in Chile
Temuco